Visé is a city and municipality of Wallonia, located on the river Meuse in the province of Liège, Belgium.

The municipality consists of the following districts: Argenteau, Cheratte, Lanaye, Lixhe, Richelle, and Visé.

In the north-east (on the eastern bank of the Meuse) the area of the municipality extends up to the village of Moelingen in the Limburgian municipality of Voeren, while in the north-west (on the western bank of the Meuse) it extends  up to the border between Belgium and the Netherlands (on the other side of which the Dutch municipality of Maastricht is situated).

The city of Visé is located in a distance of some 20 km (12,4 miles) north eastern of Belgian Liège city and of some 15 km (9,3 miles) southern of the most southern Dutch city of Maastricht.

In addition to the Meuse, the Albert Canal also passes through this town.

History
The Germans entered Belgium on 4 August 1914, and entered Visé that day as part of the opening movements of the Battle of Liège.  A small group of Belgian gendarmes opposed the advancing Germans and two of their number, Auguste Bouko and Jean-Pierre Thill, were killed in the action becoming the first Belgian casualties of World War I. On 7 August, in the Lixhe section of the town, the German 90th Infantry Regiment killed eleven civilians and destroyed eleven houses.

The Lixhe part of the town was also the site of one of Belgium's ninety eastern-frontier advanced-warning posts (postes d'alerte de la frontière est), aimed at preventing a German invasion in 1939 – its number was "PA 0".  The coal mine of Hasard de Cheratte was dug in Cheratte and exploited between 1850 and 1977.

Gallery

See also
 List of protected heritage sites in Visé

References

External links
 

 
Cities in Wallonia
Belgium–Netherlands border crossings
Municipalities of Liège Province